Get Ahead is a BBC Television programme that ran from 1958 to 1962 and offered a prize of £5,000 to a contestant's idea for an entrepreneurial project for a profitable business. It was an early forerunner of programmes such as Dragons' Den on BBC Two.

The programme was sponsored by the News Chronicle as a form of indirect advertising to skirt the Television Act 1954.

The programme was presented by Kenneth Horne and Peter West. A panel of senior business experts judged the merit of the award and included Sir Miles Thomas, who had been chairman of BOAC and the British offshoot of Monsanto, the American chemical company at the time.

References

BBC Television shows
British reality television series
1950s British television series
1960s British television series